Tristan Mombo (born 24 August 1970) is a Gabonese football manager and former player. He has represented the Gabon national team. He currently coaches the Gabon women's national team.

International career
Mombo played in 35 matches for the Gabon national football team from 1992 to 2001. He was also named in Gabon's squad for the 1994 African Cup of Nations tournament.

References

External links
 

1970 births
Living people
Place of birth missing (living people)
Gabonese footballers
Association football defenders
Gabon international footballers
1994 African Cup of Nations players
2000 African Cup of Nations players
Gabonese football managers
Women's association football managers
21st-century Gabonese people